Aruba competed at the 2015 Pan American Games in Toronto, Ontario, Canada from July 10 to 26, 2015.

A team of 25 athletes across 9 sports were selected to represent the country at the games. Sailor Philipine van Aanholt was the flagbearer of the team during the opening ceremony.

Aruba did not medal at the games, continuing its drought as one of two nations (along with The British Virgin Islands) to never win a Pan American Games medal. However, the nation did come close to ending the drought with one fourth place and two fifth-place finishes.

Competitors
The following table lists Aruba's delegation per sport and gender.

Athletics

Aruba received one wildcard.

Men
Field events

Key

Beach volleyball

Aruba qualified a men's pair.

Bowling

Aruba qualified a full team of two male and two female athletes.

Singles

Doubles

Cycling

Aruba received a reallocated spot in the men's BMX category.

BMX

Sailing

Aruba qualified one sailor.

Swimming

Aruba qualified three swimmers.

Synchronized swimming

Aruba qualified a full team of nine athletes.

Taekwondo

Aruba qualified a team of two athletes (one man and one woman).

Triathlon

Aruba received a wildcard to enter one male triathlete.

Men

Weightlifting

Aruba qualified one female weightlifter.

Women

See also
 Aruba at the 2015 Parapan American Games
 Aruba at the 2016 Summer Olympics

References

Nations at the 2015 Pan American Games
Pan American Games
2015